John J. Kaminer House is a historic home located at Gadsden, Richland County, South Carolina. It was built about 1880, and is a 1 1/2-half-story, five bay, frame cottage with a one-story rear ell. It is sheathed in weatherboard and has a gable roof with dormers.  It features a shed-roofed front porch with cast-iron porch balusters.

It was added to the National Register of Historic Places in 1986.

References 

Houses on the National Register of Historic Places in South Carolina
Houses completed in 1880
Houses in Richland County, South Carolina
National Register of Historic Places in Richland County, South Carolina